The 2019 Evolution Championship Series (commonly referred to as Evo 2019 or EVO 2019) was a fighting game event held in Las Vegas from August 2 to 4, 2019 as part of the long-running Evolution Championship Series. The event offered tournaments for various video games, including Street Fighter V, Tekken 7, and Dragon Ball FighterZ, as well as the newly released Soulcalibur VI, Mortal Kombat 11, Samurai Shodown, and Super Smash Bros. Ultimate; the latter received the most entrants with over 3,500 players participating, making it the largest in person Super Smash Bros. tournament of all time.

Venue
EVO 2019 was, once again, hosted at the Mandalay Bay resort. The Mandalay Bay Convention Center hosted the first two days of the event, while the Mandalay Bay Events Center hosted the final day for the fourth consecutive year.

Games
The lineup was announced in February 2019 to have 9 games. Returning from last year are Street Fighter V: Arcade Edition, Tekken 7, Dragon Ball FighterZ, and BlazBlue: Cross Tag Battle. New additions are Soulcalibur VI, Under Night In-Birth Exe:Late[st], Samurai Shodown, Mortal Kombat 11, and Super Smash Bros. Ultimate, which effectively replaced Super Smash Bros. for Wii U. Notably, this is the first year since EVO 2013 where Super Smash Bros. Melee was not included in the lineup, and was relegated to a side-event.

Participants
Over 9,000 participants were at Evo 2019.

Broadcast
As usual, the tournament was streamed on the streaming site Twitch, broadcast across multiple different streams.

Reveals
A few days before the tournament, a trailer for Street Fighter V: Arcade Edition revealing three upcoming characters, E. Honda, Poison, and Lucia from Final Fight was accidentally uploaded to Steam a few days ahead of its reveal at EVO by Valve, who apologized for the upload, stating that it was a "Regrettable and unintentional situation".

After the finals for Under Night In-Birth Exe:Late [st] concluded on Saturday, the game director of French Bread, Kamone Serizawa took to the stage to announce the newest version of the game, titled Under Night In-Birth Exe:Late [cl-r] alongside new character, Londrekia Light, with the game slated for an early 2020 release.

After the BlazBlue: Cross Tag Battle finals ended, Arc System Works revealed a major update to the game and revealed four out of nine new characters including Yumi from the Senran Kagura series, Akatsuki and Blitztank from Akatsuki Blitzkampf, and Neopolitan from RWBY, with a release date of November 21.

Controversy
During the Tekken 7 Grand Finals, a clip played in the form of a Metal Gear Solid-like codec call. It featured Solid Snake from the Metal Gear Solid franchise talking to Tekken producer Katsuhiro Harada saying "That was some good ass Tekken". The audience believed Solid Snake was being teased as the game's next DLC character. However, the official EVO Twitter account confirmed that the clip was not an official tease, but a joke that was done without the consent of Bandai Namco. Harada was surprised by the video and fans expressed dismay that it was not a real announcement. More than 12 hours since EVO made the statement, David Hayter, the voice of the character that was used in the clip, stated in a tweet that they have "failed to consult me, or Konami", reiterating to not use his voice to promote other games.

Results

External links

References

2019 fighting game tournaments
2019 in sports in Nevada
Evolution Championship Series
Esports competitions in the United States